Ilona Prokopevniuk is a Ukrainian freestyle wrestler. She won one of the bronze medals in the 62kg event at the 2022 World Wrestling Championships held in Belgrade, Serbia. She is a two-time bronze medalist at the European Wrestling Championships.

Career
Prokopevniuk became silver medalist at the inaugural World U23 Championships in 2017. Next year she achieved her first podium rank at the senior competition becoming third at the 2018 European Championships.

In 2020, she won one of the bronze medals in the women's 62 kg event at the Individual Wrestling World Cup held in Belgrade, Serbia. In June 2021, she won one of the bronze medals in her event at the 2021 Poland Open held in Warsaw, Poland. In October 2021, she lost her bronze medal match in the 62 kg event at the World Wrestling Championships held in Oslo, Norway.

In April 2022, she won one of the bronze medals in the 62 kg event at the European Wrestling Championships held in Budapest, Hungary. A few months later, she won the silver medal in her event at the Matteo Pellicone Ranking Series 2022 held in Rome, Italy.

Achievements

References

External links

 

Living people
Ukrainian female sport wrestlers
European Wrestling Championships medalists
World Wrestling Championships medalists
21st-century Ukrainian women
1997 births